Police Training Centre, Khulna is a police training school of the Bangladesh Police. It is situated on the east side of the Dhaka-Jessore-Khulna Highway.

History 
This institution was formed in 1972 as a Zonal Police Training School (ZPTS) at Khalishpur Municipal Market. In 1980, it was shifted to the Jessore Police Lines. On 18 September 1989 this institution was upgraded as Police Training Centre and finally shifted to the present location in Khulna city.

Facilities
Police Training Centre Khulna has two-storeyed administrative building, a five storeyed TRC barrack, a multipurpose hall, a mosque, two-storeyed Commandants quarter, Deputy Commamdants quarter, a six-storeyed SI/ASI quarters, a six-storeyed Constables quarter and three tin-shade barracks. There is also a firing range in Shiromoni of its own.

Courses
This centre mainly provides training to –

References

Police academies in Bangladesh
Buildings and structures in Khulna
Educational institutions of Khulna District